Metriacanthosauridae is an extinct family of allosauroid theropod dinosaurs that lived from the Middle Jurassic to the Early Cretaceous. When broken down into its Greek roots, it means "moderately-spined lizards". The family is split into two subgroups: Metriacanthosaurinae, which includes dinosaurs closely related to Metriacanthosaurus, and another group composed of the close relatives of Yangchuanosaurus. Metriacanthosaurids are considered carnosaurs, belonging to the Allosauroidea superfamily. The group includes species of large range in body size. Of their physical traits, most notable are their neural spines. The records of the group are mostly confined to Asia, though Metriacanthosaurus is known from Europe. Metriacanthosauridae is used as a senior synonym of Sinraptoridae.

Diagnostic traits 

Metriacanthosaurids share the following unambiguous synapomorphies among allosauroids:
 A short or absent anterior ramus of the maxilla (also found in carcharodontosaurids and piatnitzkysaurids).
 The laterosphenoid articulated on the frontal and postorbital.
 A squamosal without constriction of the lower temporal fenestra. (also found in megalosauroids)
 A flange on the squamosal covering the quadrate head laterally.
 A well-defined longitudinal groove on the lateral side of the dentary housing a row of neurovascular foramina.
 Broad, well developed spinopost-zygapophyseal lamina on the axis.
 A manus shorter than the forearm.
 Subrectangular and sheet-like neural spines of middle caudal vertebrae.
 A manus without digit V or the phalanges of digit IV (also found in neovenatorids).
 A heart-shaped cross section of the ilium's paired midshafts (also found in coelophysids).
 Fused distal end of the ischium (also found in neovenatorids and basal tetanurans).
Metriacanthosaurids share the following dental synapomorphies among theropods:

 surface centrally positioned on the labial surface of the crown roughly flattened in lateral teeth
 irregular and non-oriented enamel surface texture

Metriacanthosaurines share the following synapomorphies among metriacanthosaurids:
 The anteroventral border of the maxillary antorbital fenestra being demarcated by a raised ridge (also found in Eoraptor, coelophysids, Masiakasaurus, Marshosaurus, and Compsognathus).
 A pronounced ventral keel on the anterior dorsal vertebrae (also found in Condorraptor, Piatnitzkysaurus, Carcharodontosaurus and many megalosaurians).
 A straight posterior margin of the iliac postacetabular process.
 The angle between the long axes of the pubic shaft and boot being less than 60 degrees.
 A ventrally curved ischial shaft (also found in coelophysids, Eustreptospondylus, Afrovenator, Megalosaurus and Compsognathus).
 A bulbous fibular crest on the tibia (also found in Sinosaurus).

Classification
Carrano, Benson & Sampson (2012) noted that the name Metriacanthosauridae should be used as it has priority over Sinraptoridae. Cladistically, Sinraptoridae had been latest defined in 2005 by Paul Sereno as the most inclusive monophyletic group that contains Sinraptor dongi and all species closer to Sinraptor than to either Allosaurus fragilis, Carcharodontosaurus saharicus, or the house sparrow (Passer domesticus).

Furthermore, the 2012 study named a new subfamily Metriacanthosaurinae to include all metriacanthosaurids more closely related to Metriacanthosaurus than to Yangchuanosaurus. A much larger phylogenetic analysis found Xuanhanosaurus, previously considered a basal megalosauroid, to be the basalmost metriacanthosaurid. Both Poekilopleuron and Lourinhanosaurus were recovered outside the family, and many taxa within the Metriacanthosauridae were in polytomy. However, the positions of Xuanhanosaurus and Poekilopleuron were very unstable, and their exclusion from the analysis gave a more resolved and stable cladogram. The cladogram presented here follows that study.

Palaeobiogeography 
Metriacanthosauridae fossils have only been found in modern Europe and Asia, parts of the prehistoric landmass Laurasia. From those found in Asia, most are from China, with a few discoveries in Thailand and other Asian countries. The group is thought to have originated in Asia and spread westward to Europe. Yangchuanosaurus has only been found in Yangchuan, Sichuan, China. Metriacanthosaurus has been found in the Oxford Clay in Southern England. Similar to Yangchuanosaurus, Sinraptor has been found in Sichuan, but also in Xinjiang. In 2008, Xu and Clarke described a large tooth found in the Junggard Basin in Xinjian, China, belonging to a large sinraptorid. The Late Jurassic Qigu Formation in Xinjiang has also yielded evidence of metriacanthosaurid habitation in the form of sauropod bones with bitemarks most likely belonging to a metriacanthosaurid. Siamotyrannus has been found exclusively in Thailand. Shidaisaurus has been found in Yunnan, China. Fragmentary remains of allosauroids from the late Middle-early Late Jurassic Marnes de Dives in northern France bear close similarities to metriocanthosaurids, and may belong to members of the group.

References

External links

 
Middle Jurassic first appearances
Prehistoric dinosaur families